Nashik (Marathi: [naːʃik] , also called as Nasik ) is a city in the northern region of the Indian state of Maharashtra. Situated on the banks of river Godavari, Nashik is the fourth largest city of Maharashtra after Mumbai, Pune and Nagpur. District population of Nashik is around 80 lakhs. Mumbai–Pune–Nashik is known as the golden triangle of Maharashtra state. Nashik is well known for being one of the Hindu pilgrimage sites of the Kumbh Mela, which is held every 12 years. Nashik is located about 190 km north of state capital Mumbai. The city is called the "Wine Capital of India" as more than half of India's vineyards and wineries are located here. Around 90% of all Indian wine comes from the Nashik Valley.

Nashik is one of the fastest-growing cities in India. It has been a major industrial center in automobile hub. The city houses companies like Exxelia, Atlas Copco, Robert Bosch GmbH, CEAT Limited, Crompton Greaves, Graphite India, ThyssenKrupp, Epcos, Everest Industries, Gabriel India, GlaxoSmithKline, Hindustan Coca-Cola, Hindustan Unilever Limited, Jindal Polyster, Jyoti Structures, Kirlosker Oil Engines, KSB Pumps, Larsen & Toubro, Mahindra and Mahindra, Mahindra Sona, United Spirits Limited, Perfect Circle Industries, Mahindra Ugine Steel, Samsonite, Shalimar Paints, Siemens, VIP Industries, Indian Oil Corporation, XLO India Limited and Jindal Saw, among others.

Etymology
The name, Nashik, derived from the Sanskrit word 'Nāsikā' which literally means 'Nose'.

As per Ramayana, Nashik is the location on the banks of Godavari river where Laxman, by the wish of Lord Rama, cut the nose of demoness Shurpanakha and thus this city was named as "Nashik". It is also known by the name Panchavati.

History

Nashik was known by many names. It was known as "Padmanagar" during the Satya Yuga, "Trikantak" during the Treta Yuga, "Janasthana" during the Dvapara Yuga, and finally "Navashikh" or "Nashik" during the Kali Yuga, according to Hindu traditions. It was known as "Gulshanabad," or "Rose City," during the Mughal period. Nashik is significant in mythology, history, social life, and culture. The city is located on the banks of the Godavari River, making it a sacred site for Hindus around the world. During his 14-year exile from Ayodhya, Lord Rama, the King of Ayodhya, is said to have made Nashik his home.

Geography 

Due to high pollution created by factories in proximity to the city, the river was dying at an alarming rate. It has since been successfully cleaned.

Nashik lies on the western edge of the Deccan Plateau, an ancient volcanic formation.

Climate 
The city's tropical location and high altitude combine to give it a relatively mild version of a hot semi-arid climate (Köppen BSh). Temperatures rise slightly in October, but this is followed by the cool season from November to February. The cool season sees warm temperatures of around  during the day, but cool nights, with lows averaging , and extremely dry air.

Governance and politics

Civic administration 
Nashik city is governed by the Nashik Municipal Corporation. The city has developed on both banks of the Godavari, which divides the city into almost equal halves.

The Municipal Commissioner of Nashik is Ramesh Pawar.

The ward committee consists of councillors representing the electoral wards within the territorial area of the ward committee. There are six ward committees namely Nashik (E), Nashik (W), Nashik Road, Panchavati, CIDCO and Satpur. The main function of the committees is to approve the cost of works for the wards, incorporate the expenses in the budget etc.

Civic services 
The Nashik Municipal Corporation (NMC) is planning to start major civic projects in 2020. Projects like the creation of more smart roads, setting up of 800 CCTVs, installation of LED streetlights, Goda beautification project, construction of two major water treatment projects (WTPs), upgradation of STPs, making smart parking operational, etc. would be given priority by the municipal corporation.

Solid waste management 
In the Nashik Municipal Corporation area about 225 MT of solid waste is generated per day. Unlike other Indian cities, this garbage is collected by vehicles titled 'Ghantagadi' (meaning the vehicle with a bell): a system which has resulted in smaller versions of the ghantagadi ply in the congested old city areas. A plant has been set by the Nashik Municipal Corporation near Pandav Leni (Pandavleni Caves) to process the garbage and convert into compost.

Digital services 
The NMC provides an online website for various civic services like birth certificate registration, medical services, taxes, development services, etc.

Demographics 
Nashik is the fourth largest city in Maharashtra in terms of population after Mumbai, Pune and Nagpur. According to the Census of India, 2011, Nashik had a population of 1,486,053. Males constitute 782,517 of the population and females 703,536. Metropolitan Nashik population was 1,561,809 in which 821,921 were males and 739,888 were females. Nashik city had an average literacy rate of 89.85%: male literacy was 93.40%, and female literacy was 85.92%.

The sex ratio is 894 per 1,000 males for Nashik city. Child sex ratio is 865 girls per 1,000 boys. In Nashik, 11.42% of the population is under 6 years of age. Thus it was the fourth largest urban area of Maharashtra State after Mumbai, Pune and Nagpur.

Art and culture 

In February 2016, The Statue of Ahimsa, a 108 ft idol of first Jain tirthankara Rishabhdev carved in monolithic stone was consecrated at Mangi Tungi. It is recorded in the Guinness Book of World Records as the tallest Jain idol in the world.

Trirashmi Caves 

The Trirashmi (Pandavleni) Caves, or Nashik Caves, are a group of 24 caves carved between the 1st century BCE and the 2nd century CE, representing the Hinayana Buddhist caves.

Dams 
 Gangapur Dam is on the river Godavari near Gangawadi village and is an earthen dam, Nashik.
 Chankapur dam on the Girna river is one of the big dams built by the British in the 19th century. It is 3 km from the village Abhona in Kalwan tehsil and 60 km from Nashik.
 Kashypi Dam is on the Kashypi river near Rajapur, Nashik.
 Girna Dam is an earthfill dam on river Girna near Nandgaon, Nashik District.
 Darna Dam is a gravity dam on Darna river near Igatpuri, Nashik district.

Kumbh Mela 

The Kumbh Mela is celebrated every six years at Haridwar and Allahabad and Maha Kumbh takes place every twelve years at four places: Allahabad, Haridwar, Ujjain, and Nashik. According to the Puranas, it is believed that Kumbh derives its name from an immortal pot of nectar, which the devatas (Gods) and rakshasas (Demons) fought over. The four places where the nectar fell are at the banks of river Godavari in Nashik, river Kshipra in Ujjain, river Ganges in Haridwar and at Triveni Sangam of Ganga, Yamuna and invisible Saraswati River in Allahabad.

Economy

Agriculture 

In early 1925, the table grape revolution was started in Ojhar, a small town near Nashik, by Raosaheb Jairam Krishna Gaikwad. Today, table grapes are exported to Europe, the Middle East, and Asia.

The total cultivable area in Nashik district is 864,000 hectares, of which the average Kharip crop area is 663,200 hectares, while the average Rabbi crop area is 136,500 hectares. The sown area is 658,763 hectares (99%) and the forest land is 340,000 hectares (21.75%). The uncultivable area is 23,000 hectares (1.48%).

Industry 
The Igatpuri-Nashik-Sinnar investment region is an important node in the US$90 billion Delhi Mumbai Industrial Corridor Project.

Nashik is a defense and aerospace manufacturing hub with Hindustan Aeronautics Limited aircraft manufacturing plant located at Ozar. The Currency Note Press and India Security Press are on Nashik Road, where Indian currency and government stamp papers are printed respectively.

Existing industrial areas in Nashik district are Satpur, Ambad, Sinnar, Igatpuri, Dindori and Vinchur. The proposed additional areas are Sinnar, Malegaon and Rajur Bahula.

Large-scale industries present in Nashik district are Atlas Copco, Robert Bosch GmbH, CEAT Limited, Crompton Greaves, Graphite India, ThyssenKrupp, Epcos, Everest Industries, Gabriel India, GlaxoSmithKline, Hindustan Coca-Cola, Hindustan Unilever Limited, Jindal Polyster, Jyoti Structures, Kirlosker Oil Engines, KSB Pumps, Larsen & Toubro, Mahindra and Mahindra, Mahindra Sona, United Spirits Limited, Perfect Circle Industries, Mahindra Ugine Steel, Samsonite, Shalimar Paints, Siemens, VIP Industries, Indian Oil Corporation, XLO India Limited and Jindal Saw.

Apart from manufacturing, Nashik is an emerging investment destination for Information Technology companies. Tata Consultancy Services has invested in Nashik under the government of India BPO promotion scheme (IBPS). Also WNS, Accenture, TCS has set up Digital Impact Square, or DISQ, which is a social innovation center.

Nashik has a textile industry. National Bank for Agriculture and Rural Development has selected Yeola Block for development of Paithani Cluster. To facilitate exports, a container freight station was started at MIDC Ambad by the Central Government.

Wine industry 

Nashik has been described as "The Wine Capital of India". The Nashik region reportedly produced 10,000 tonnes of grapes per year.

In 2013, there were 22 wineries in Nashik, out of 46 wineries throughout India. The largest vineyard in Nashik is the Sula Vineyards.

In the harvest season, Nashik is home to several wine festivals, such as the India Grape Harvest and SulaFest.

Transport

By Air

Nashik has its airport located at Ozar and an old airport at Gandhinagar which connected Nashik to Mumbai. The Gandhinagar Airport is now reserved for the military. Nashik Airport is a domestic airport and is connected to Ahmedabad, Mumbai, Pune, Hyderabad, Bangalore, Belgaum and Delhi under the UDAN scheme. SpiceJet, Trujet, Star Air and AirIndia provide services from Nashik Airport.

By Rail
Nasik Road railway station is city railway station along with Deolali which lies within the city boundary.

By Road
Nashik is served by National Highway 60. Mumbai-Nashik Expressway connects Nashik to Mumbai.
India's first 10 lane expressway is going to built between Nashik & Pune.Surat-Nashik-Chennai expressway goes through Nashik city. The Samruddhi Highway also goes 15 kms from Nashik city.

Public transport
Nashik Municipal Corporation (NMC) has rolled out its city bus service Citilinc on 8 July 2021.The previous state government had given its nod to the NMC to take over the city bus service from the ailing Maharashtra State Road Transport Corporation (MSRTC).
Metro – Greater Nashik Metro is proposed by Maharashtra Metro Rail Corporation Limited. It will be operational in 2024.
Trams [1889-1933] - Nashik was the third city in India after Kolkata and Mumbai to get trams. Trams started operation in 1889.It originated from the Old Municipal Corporation building located on Main Road, and terminated at the Nashik Road railway station (8–10 km). It is passed through areas of Ganjamal (the now defunct bus stop was earlier a tram stop) and behind the Fame Multiplex. Brady's; a private company funded the project and later introduced India's first petrol engine driven tram under the aegis of Nasik Tramway Co. The tramway closed down in around 1933 owing to the successive years of famine and plague, it had run into heavy losses.

Education 

The city has two state-run universities: the Yashwantrao Chavan Maharashtra Open University and the Maharashtra University of Health Sciences.

International relations

Twin towns and sister cities
  Budapest, Hungary (2018)
Tehsils of Nashik:

 Malegaon
 Dindori
 Nandgaon
 Igatpuri
 Kalwan

Notable people 
 Abhishek Raut, cricketer
 Anant Laxman Kanhere, Indian independence fighter
 Anjana Thamke, athlete
 Dadasaheb Phalke, father of Indian cinema
 Pandit Dattatreya Vishnu Paluskar, Hindustani classical vocalist
 Dadasaheb Gaikwad (Bhaurao Krishnaji Gaikwad), politician, social worker
 Vinayak Damodar Savarkar, Indian freedom fighter, revolutionary, ideologue, pro-independence activism, politician, poet, writer and playwright
 Kusumagraj (Vishnu Vāman Shirwādkar), Marathi poet, playwright, and novelist
 Shivaji Tupe, painter
 Krishnaji Gopal Karve, Indian freedom fighter, revolutionary
 Tatya Tope, leader in the Indian Rebellion of 1857
 Dhairya Dand, inventor, artist, designer
 Kavita Raut, long-distance runner
 Sunil Khandbahale, innovator, entrepreneur, language enthusiast
 Dattaraya Ramchandra Kaprekar, recreational mathematician
 Sayali Bhagat, model/actress, Femina Miss India world 2004 
 Mahadev Govind Ranade, Indian scholar, social reformer and author
 Ramesh Raskar, computer scientist 
 Dattu Baban Bhokanal, rower
 Chinmay Udgirkar, actor
 Vidit Gujrathi, Indian chess player
 Uttara Mhatre Kher, former Miss India
 Saiyami Kher, actress
 Anjali Patil, actress
 Shashank Khaitan, director
 Mrunal Dusanis, actress
Lalita Pawar, actress
Chhagan Bhujbal, Politician
Uttamrao Dhikale, Politician

References 

 Unravel Nashik, The City of Abundance

Nashik Municipal Corporation

 
Metropolitan cities in India
Places in the Ramayana
Locations in Hindu mythology
Places in Hindu worship
Cities in Maharashtra